Break It Up may refer to:

"Break It Up", a song from the 1975 album Horses by Patti Smith
"Break It Up" (Foreigner song), 1982
"Break It Up" (Rocket from the Crypt song), 1998
"Break It Up" (Scooter song), 1996
Break It Up (SSD album), 1985
Break It Up (Jemina Pearl album), 2009

See also
"Break It up, Break It Up", the third episode of The Drew Carey Shows second season